Corticotropin-releasing hormone (CRH) (also known as corticotropin-releasing factor (CRF) or corticoliberin; corticotropin may also be spelled corticotrophin) is a peptide hormone involved in stress responses. It is a releasing hormone that belongs to corticotropin-releasing factor family.  In humans, it is encoded by the CRH gene. Its main function is the stimulation of the pituitary synthesis of adrenocorticotropic hormone (ACTH), as part of the hypothalamic–pituitary–adrenal axis (HPA axis).

Corticotropin-releasing hormone (CRH) is a 41-amino acid peptide derived from a 196-amino acid preprohormone. CRH is secreted by the paraventricular nucleus (PVN) of the hypothalamus in response to stress. Increased CRH production has been observed to be associated with Alzheimer's disease and major depression, and autosomal recessive hypothalamic corticotropin deficiency has multiple and potentially fatal metabolic consequences including hypoglycemia.

In addition to being produced in the hypothalamus, CRH is also synthesized in peripheral tissues, such as T lymphocytes, and is highly expressed in the placenta. In the placenta, CRH is a marker that determines the length of gestation and the timing of parturition and delivery. A rapid increase in circulating levels of CRH occurs at the onset of parturition, suggesting that, in addition to its metabolic functions, CRH may act as a trigger for parturition.

A recombinant version for diagnostics is called corticorelin (INN).

Actions and psychopharmacology 
CRH is produced in response to stress, predominantly by parvocellular neurosecretory cells within the paraventricular nucleus of the hypothalamus and is released at the median eminence from neurosecretory terminals of these neurons into the primary capillary plexus of the hypothalamo-hypophyseal portal system. The portal system carries the CRH to the anterior lobe of the pituitary, where it stimulates corticotropes to secrete adrenocorticotropic hormone (ACTH) and other biologically-active substances (β-endorphin). ACTH stimulates the synthesis of cortisol, glucocorticoids, mineralocorticoids and DHEA.

In the short term, CRH can suppress appetite, increase subjective feelings of anxiety, and perform other functions like boosting attention. 

During chronic stress conditions such as post-traumatic stress disorder (PTSD), blood serum levels of CRH are decreased in combat veterans with PTSD compared to healthy individuals. It is believed that chronic stress enhances the negative feedback inhibition of the HPA axis, resulting in lower CRH levels and HPA function.

Abnormally high levels of CRH have been found in people with major depression, and in the cerebrospinal fluid of people who have committed suicide.

Corticotropin-releasing hormone has been shown to interact with its receptors corticotropin-releasing hormone receptor 1 (CRFR1) and corticotropin-releasing hormone receptor 2 (CRFR2) in order to induce its effects. Injection of CRH into the rodent paraventricular nucleus of the hypothalamus (PVN) can increase CRFR1 expression, with increased expression leading to depression-like behaviors. Sex differences have also been observed with respect to both CRH and the receptors that it interacts with. CRFR1 has been shown to exist at higher levels in the female nucleus accumbens, olfactory tubercle, and rostral anteroventral periventricular nucleus (AVPV) when compared to males, while male voles show increased levels of CRFR2 in the bed nucleus of the stria terminalis compared to females.

The CRH-1 receptor antagonist pexacerfont is currently under investigation for the treatment of generalized anxiety disorder. Another CRH-1 antagonist antalarmin has been researched in animal studies for the treatment of anxiety, depression and other conditions, but no human trials with this compound have been carried out.

The activation of the CRH1 receptor has been linked with the euphoric feelings that accompany alcohol consumption. A CRH1 receptor antagonist developed by Pfizer, CP-154,526 is under investigation for the potential treatment of alcoholism.

Increased CRH production has been observed to be associated with Alzheimer's disease.

Although one action of CRH is immunosuppression via the action of cortisol, CRH itself can actually heighten the immune system's inflammation response, a process being investigated in multiple sclerosis research.

Autosomal recessive hypothalamic corticotropin deficiency has multiple and potentially fatal metabolic consequences including hypoglycemia. 

Alpha-helical CRH-(9–41) acts as a CRH antagonist.

Role in parturition 
CRH is synthesized by the placenta and seems to determine the duration of pregnancy.

Levels rise towards the end of pregnancy just before birth and current theory suggests three roles of CRH in parturition:

  Increases levels of dehydroepiandrosterone (DHEA) directly by action on the fetal adrenal gland, and indirectly via the mother's pituitary gland. DHEA has a role in preparing for and stimulating cervical contractions.
 Increases prostaglandin availability in uteroplacental tissues. Prostaglandins activate cervical contractions.
 Prior to parturition it may have a role inhibiting contractions, through increasing cAMP levels in the myometrium.

In culture, trophoblast CRH is inhibited by progesterone, which remains high throughout pregnancy. Its release is stimulated by glucocorticoids and catecholamines, which increase prior to parturition lifting this progesterone block.

Structure 
The 41-amino acid sequence of CRH was first discovered in sheep by Vale et al. in 1981. Its full sequence is:

 SQEPPISLDLTFHLLREVLEMTKADQLAQQAHSNRKLLDIA

The rat and human peptides are identical and differ from the ovine sequence only by 7 amino acids.

 SEEPPISLDLTFHLLREVLEMARAEQLAQQAHSNRKLMEII

Role in non-mammalian vertebrates
In mammals, studies suggest that CRH has no significant thyrotropic effect. However, in representatives of all non-mammalian vertebrates, it has been found that, in addition to its corticotropic function, CRH has a potent thyrotropic function, acting with TRH to control the hypothalamic–pituitary–thyroid axis (TRH has been found to be less potent than CRH in some species).

See also 
 Corticotropin-releasing hormone receptor
 ACTH
 Glucocorticoids
 Proopiomelanocortin
 Hypothalamic-pituitary-adrenal axis
 Cushing's syndrome
 Addison's disease

References

Further reading

External links 

 

 
Hormones of the hypothalamus
Peptide hormones
Corticotropin-releasing hormone receptor agonists
Hormones of the hypothalamus-pituitary-adrenal axis